McAdoo is a surname. Notable people with the surname include:

Ben McAdoo (born 1977), American football coach
Bob McAdoo (born 1951), American basketball player
Derrick McAdoo (born 1965), American football player
Eleanor Wilson McAdoo (1889–1967), daughter of Woodrow Wilson and second wife of William Gibbs McAdoo
Greg McAdoo, venture capitalist
Harriette Pipes McAdoo (1940–2009), American sociologist and professor
James Michael McAdoo (born 1993), American basketball player
John David McAdoo (1824–1883), Confederate general 
Mike McAdoo (born 1990), American football player
Orpheus McAdoo (1858–1900), African-American singer and minstrel show impresario
Stephen McAdoo (born 1970), American football player and coach
Tullie McAdoo (1884–1961), American Negro league baseball player
Violet McAdoo (1900–1961), Irish artist
William McAdoo (New Jersey politician), (1853–1930)
William Gibbs McAdoo (1863–1941), American Democratic politician and Secretary of the Treasury in World War I